The Russellville Micropolitan  Statistical Area (μSA), as defined by the United States Census Bureau, is an area consisting of two counties in the U.S. state of Arkansas, anchored by the city of Russellville.

As of the 2010 census, the μSA had a population of 83,939.

Counties
Pope
Yell

Communities

Places with more than 25,000 inhabitants
Russellville (Principal city)

Places with 2,000 to 5,000 inhabitants
Dardanelle
Pottsville
Atkins
Danville

Places with 500 to 1,500 inhabitants
Dover
Ola
London
Plainview

Places with less than 500 inhabitants
Hector
Belleville
Havana
Corinth

Unincorporated places
Aly
Augsburg
Bluffton
Centerville
Gravelly
Nogo
Rover

Demographics
As of the census of 2000, there were 75,608 people, 28,623 households, and 20,822 families residing within the μSA. The racial makeup of the μSA was 91.74% White, 2.29% African American, 0.65% Native American, 0.65% Asian, 0.03% Pacific Islander, 3.18% from other races, and 1.45% from two or more races. Hispanic or Latino of any race were 5.04% of the population.

The median income for a household in the μSA was $30,493, and the median income for a family was $36,232. Males had a median income of $26,543 versus $18,728 for females. The per capita income for the μSA was $15,651.

See also
Arkansas census statistical areas

References